George Kongor Arop (born 1951) was the Second Vice President of Sudan from February 1994 to October 2000. He was a police officer, the governor of Bahr el-Ghazal from 1992 to 1993, the president of the African National Congress and was granted an honorary doctorate from the University of Juba in political science. His period as Governor of Bahr el Ghazal saw the acceleration of efforts at Islamization of the region.

Kongor Arop was appointed by Omar al-Bashir as Second Vice President of Sudan in February 1994 and was dismissed in October 2000. He was a member of the ruling Islamist National Congress (Sudan) until dismissed. He planned to contest for the presidency of Sudan in 2006.

References

Living people
Vice presidents of Sudan
Sudanese politicians
1951 births